William Lee Sims, II (October 17, 1896  April 29, 1977) was an American businessman, farmer, and philanthropist.

Early life and education 
William "Bill" Lee Sims, II was born on October 17, 1896 to Wythe Davis Sims and Addie Sousley Sims in Birmingham, Alabama. He attended Elyton School and Central High School in Birmingham. After his freshman year his parents sent him to East Aurora, New York to be part of the inaugural class at the Roycroft School of Life for Boys, founded by his father's friends Elbert Hubbard and Alice Moore Hubbard.

When Sims returned to Alabama in 1913 he worked for his father's advertising agency, but had little interest in the work. His father bought 80 acres of land for Sims to farm in Eden, Alabama; Sims named it "The Garden of Eden". Sims attended Auburn University, then known as Alabama Polytechnic Institute, from 1916-1918. He was a member of the Wirt Literary Society and played varsity baseball and basketball. His education was cut short by World War I; he served in the U.S. Army and was stationed at Fort Gordon near Augusta, Georgia.

Career 
Sims began his career with Colgate-Palmolive Company in 1924, first as a salesman. He quickly rose through the ranks and in 1927 was sent to Milan, Italy to further establish the Italian branch of the company. in 1930 he became the Continental Sales and Advertising Manager for the European branch, headquartered in Paris. He spent ten years in Paris, before returning to New Jersey as the assistant to the Edward H, Little, Colgate-Palmolive President.

From 1943-44 Sims served as the head of Drugs and Chemical Unit at the Office of Price Administration in Washington, DC. He returned to Colgate-Palmolive as the Vice President of Foreign Operations in 1945. He later became the first President of Colgate-Palmolive International (1952) and was elected President of the Colgate-Palmolive Company in July 1955.  He retired from the company in March 1957 after 33 years of service and moved to Orlando, Florida. Once in Florida he returned to his farming roots and established Sims Groves, Inc.

Sims served as a founding member and Secretary-Treasurer of the St. Augustine Historical Restoration and Preservation Commission from 1959-1969, appointed by Governor LeRoy Collins. He was also a member of the Executive Committee of the Auburn Alumni Association, a trustee of the Auburn University Foundation, a trustee for the Ringling School of Art, and served as the director of the Orlando Art Association (Loch Haven Art Center), the Loch Haven Park Board, and the Florida National Bank at Orlando.

Personal life 
Sims married Kathleen Wilkes in 1923; they had two children, Wythe Davis Sims, II, and Betty Kathleen Sims. He died in Orlando on April 29, 1977 at the age of 81.

Sims was a member of many avocational associations, including the University Club of Orlando, the American Club of London, the American Club of Paris, the Newcomen Society in North America, the Blue Lodge, the Shriners, the Scottish Rite (32nd degree), and the Academy of Political Science. He was an avid golfer and was a member of many golf clubs around the world.

Sims donated $27,000 to the St. Augustine Historical Restoration and Preservation Commission to reconstruct a colonial silversmith shop. Census records from 1780 showed that a silversmith named William Sims had worked in St. Augustine; this connection gave Sims interest in seeing it rebuilt. Today the Sims Silversmith Shop still stands, but operates as retail space.

References 

1896 births
1977 deaths
People from Birmingham, Alabama
American farmers
20th-century American businesspeople